"If the Boot Fits" is a song recorded by American country music artist Granger Smith. It was released to radio on March 14, 2016 as the second and final single from his major label debut album, Remington. The song was written by Jordan Schmidt, Andy Albert and Mitchell Tenpenny.

Critical reception
Website Taste of Country gave the song a favorable review, praising the lyrics and writing that "“If the Boot Fits” is a familiar country love story that borrows from a fairytale."

Music video
The music video was directed by Paul De La Cerda and premiered in August 2016.

Chart performance

Weekly charts

Year-end charts

References 

2016 songs
2016 singles
Granger Smith songs
Song recordings produced by Frank Rogers (record producer)
BBR Music Group singles
Songs written by Jordan Schmidt
Songs written by Andy Albert